Namivand-e Olya (also Romanized as Nāmīvand-e ‘Olyā; also known as Nāmīvand Qal‘eh and Nāmvand-e Qal‘eh) is a village in Chaqa Narges Rural District, Mahidasht District, Kermanshah County, Kermanshah Province, Iran. At the 2006 census, its population was 322, in 72 families.

References 

Populated places in Kermanshah County